The long-nosed potoroo (Potorous tridactylus) is a small, hopping, gerbil-like mammal native to forests and shrubland of southeastern Australia and Tasmania. A member of the rat-kangaroo family (Potoroidae), it lives alone and digs at night for fungi, roots, or small insects. It is also a marsupial (like kangaroos) and carries its young in a pouch. The long-nosed potoroo is threatened by habitat loss and introduced species such as cats or foxes. There are two subspecies: P. t. tridactylus on mainland Australia, and P. t. apicalis on Tasmania, with lighter fur.

At first glance, the long-nosed potoroo with its pointed nose and grey-brown fur looks very much like a bandicoot — that is, until it hops away with its front feet tucked into its chest, revealing its close relationship with the kangaroo family. The long-nosed potoroo exhibits many morphological specializations such as an elongated pointed rostral region (nose), erect ears, large eyes, claws for digging, and long robust hind legs.

As it is rarely seen in the wild, better indicators of its presence are the runways it makes through the undergrowth and the hollow diggings it leaves behind when feeding on underground roots and fungi.

Taxonomy 
The species was first noted in 1790 by John White in a record of his journey to Botany Bay. The informal description named the animal as a "Poto Roo" or "Kangaroo Rat" and was accompanied by an illustration.

The classification of the genus Potorous has seen the name subjected to frequent revisions. The following is a summary of the associated species and subspecies,

 genus Potorous
 P. gilbertii Gilbert's potoroo,
 P. longipes Long-footed potoroo,
 P. platyops Broad-faced potoroo, † modern extinction
 P. tridactylus Long-nosed potoroo,
Potorous tridactylus tridactylus
Potorous tridactylus apicalis

Habitat and distribution

The long-nosed potoroo is found in a variety of microhabitats located in the Southern Highlands of New South Wales and South-Western Victoria on the Australian mainland, and in Tasmania.  Its bones have been found in a number of cave deposits, indicating it was once more widespread than it is today. This species prefers a range of vegetation types, from subtropical and warm temperate rainforest, through tall open forest with dense understorey, to dense coastal heaths. Its main requirement is thick groundcover, which it needs for protection and nesting material. It also prefers light soils that are easy to dig in for the underground roots and fungi that it eats.

In Tasmania, large overlapping home ranges of  have been recorded, with males typically acquiring more land than females. Home ranges in Victoria, however, are much smaller.

Life history and behaviour

Generally, the long-nosed potoroo is solitary and has only been observed in brief encounters for mating and when with young. There have also been reports of several males and females feeding in loose aggregations. These mammals are non-territorial and frequently have overlapping home ranges. The male's home range can overlap many females', but the female's home range is usually exclusive, allowing the female access to the male year round.  Breeding, however, usually occurs from late winter to early summer. Females are polyestrous and can have up to two reproductive sessions per year.

The long-nosed potoroo is nocturnal, spending much of its time within the shelter of understorey vegetation. It uses long, slightly curved claws on its front feet to dig up its food. It is an omnivore and eats underground fruiting bodies of fungi, roots, fruit, flowers, seeds, and insects and their larvae. Fungi are the main dietary component, and are a very important resource in the potoroo's diet, with at least 50 species consumed depending on seasonal variation. During the fall and winter months, potoroos primarily consume fungi and seeds, while in the spring and summer months, the amount of arthropods, plant tissue, fruits, and flowers consumed increases.

The long-nosed potoroo sniffs the ground with a side to side motion near the vicinity of food. Once the long-nosed potoroo has located a possible food source (with its sense of smell), it positions itself to begin excavating with its forepaws.

Because it eats fungi, it spreads fungal spores in its droppings. Some of these fungi grow on the roots of native plants and assist the plant in the uptake of nutrients from the soil.

Threatening processes
The long-nosed potoroo was one of the first marsupials to be described by European settlers. Unfortunately, these encounters were followed by the clearing of much of its habitat for grazing and other land uses.

Threats to the long-nosed potoroo include feral cats, wild dogs, red foxes, human settlement, and fragmentation for agriculture, livestock grazing, habitat degradation, habitat clearance/loss, and inappropriate fire regimes.
The pattern of burning in areas of remaining habitat has also changed, with more severe and more frequent fires creating a sparse understorey that provides little shelter for small mammals like the potoroo.

This species is listed as Near Threatened according to the IUCN red list,  Vulnerable in Queensland according to the Nature Conservation Act 1992 and also nationally by the Environment Protection and Biodiversity Conservation Act 1999.  It is listed under the Flora and Fauna Guarantee Act 1988 as endangered in Victoria.

Recovery actions
Past conservation initiatives listed the long-nosed potoroo under the Flora and Fauna Guarantee Act of 1988, construction of conservation reserves at Barren Ground Nature Reserve and Budderoo National Park, and the preparation of a recovery plan which outlines priorities for species research. A completed national recovery plan is still a work in progress, however, the Department of Environment and Conservation has prepared a (PAS) Priorities Action Statement in order to help aid in the recovery of threatened species in New South Wales.  

This statement encourages:
Controlling fox population
Controlling weeds that affect habitat
Enforcing appropriate fire regimes
Increasing habitat by creating barriers/corridors linking habitat patches
Preventing spread of disease (Phytophthora sp.)
Restricting livestock from habitat
Pursue formal protection of remaining areas of known habitat
Inform public
Researching:
Estimate population sizes and densities using survey methods
Genetic differences between populations 
Diet preference
Effects of disturbance on fungi species(e.g. fertilizer use)
Effects of predation on populations
Determine need for captive breeding-reintroduction programs

There is ongoing monitoring of the long-nosed potoroo while a recovery plan is being prepared for this species.

References

Cited references

General references

Bali R. Lewis B.R. and Brown K. (2003). The Status and Distriburtion of the Cobaki Long-nosed Potoroo Population, report prepared for Parsons Brinckerhoff.
Bennett, AF and Baxter, BJ (1989). Diet of the Long-Nosed Potoroo, Potorous-Tridactylus (Marsupialia, Potoroidae), in Southwestern Victoria. Australian Wildlife Research 16, 263–271.
Bennett, A.F. (1993). Microhabitat use by the Long-nosed potoroo, Potorous tridactylus, and other small mammals in remnant forest vegetation of southwestern Victoria. Wildlife Research 20, 267-285.
Claridge, A.W., Paull, D.J., and Barry, S.C. (2010). Detection of medium-sized ground-dwelling mammals using infrared digital cameras: an alternative way forward?. Australian Mammalogy 32, 165–171
Curtis, Lee K.Queensland’s Threatened Animals. Collingwood, Vic: CSIRO Pub, 2011. eBook Collection (EBSCOhost). Web. 14 Nov. 2013.
G.J. Frankham, K.A. Handasyde & M.D.B. Eldridge (2012). Novel insights into the phylogenetic relationships of the endangered marsupia genus Potorous. Molecular Phylogenetics and Evolution 64: 592-602
Johnston, P.G. (2002). Long-nosed Potoroo, in Strahan, R. (ed.). 2002. The Mammals of Australia. Revised Edition. Australian Museum and Reed New Holland publishers.
Johnson, P.M. (2003). Kangaroos of Queensland. Queensland Museum.
Kitchener, D.J. (1973) Notes on home range and movement in two small macropods, the Potoroo (potorous apicalis and the Quokka (setonix brachyurus). Mammalia 37: 231-240
Lewis, B.D and Freestone, C.Z. (2009). Integrated Plan of Management for the Endangered Long-nosed Potoroo (Potorous tridactylus tridactylus) Population At Cobaki. Prepared by Lewis Ecological Surveys for PacificLink Alliance.
Maser, C., Claridge, A.W. and Trappe, J.M. (2008) Trees, Truffles, and Beasts: How Forests Function. Rutgers University Press, New Brunswick, New Jersey.
Maxwell, S., Burbidge, A.A, and Morris, K. (eds.) (1996). The 1996 Action Plan For Australian Marsupials and Monotremes. Wildlife Australia Endangered Species Program Project Number 500.
Norton, M. A., French, K. O. & Claridge, A. W. (2010). Habitat associations of the long-nosed potoroo (Potorous tridactylus) at multiple spatial scales. Australian Journal of Zoology, 58 (5), 303-316.
Seebeck, J.H. (1981b). Potorous tridactylus (Kerr), (Marsupialia Macropodidae); its distribution, status and habitat preferences in Victoria. Australian Wildlife Research 8: 285-306.
Strahan, R. (1995). Mammals of Australia. Smithsonian Institution Press, Washington, D.C.
“Threatened Species Advanced Search." Office of Environment and Heritage. N.p., n.d. Web. 04 Dec. 2013 
Long-footed Potoroo (Potorous longipes) Recovery Plan, February 2000
*(potoroo = Indigenous name for small rat-kangaroo; tridactylus = “three-toed” because it was originally believed that they only had three toes)
Vernes, K., & Jarman, P. (2014). Long-nosed potoroo (Potorous tridactylus) behaviour and handling times when foraging for buried truffles. Australian Mammalogy, 36(1), 128. doi:10.1071/am13037

External links
 More about this species in Southwest Victoria
 The Aussie Long-Nosed Potoroo Ark Conservation Project

Potoroids
Mammals of Tasmania
Extinct mammals of South Australia
Mammals of Queensland
Mammals of New South Wales
Mammals of Victoria (Australia)
Mammals described in 1792